Donald Tang is an American businessman. He is the founder of Tang Media Partners and Global Road Entertainment. Tang is the former vice chairman of Bear Stearns and former chairman of Bear Stearns Asia. In November 2022, Tang joined Chinese fast-fashion brand Shein as executive vice chairman.

Early life
Tang was born in Shanghai, China, where his parents were college professors. At the age of 18, in 1982, he followed his long time girlfriend Jean to Los Angeles after she and her family immigrated to America. She is now his wife. Working in a series of restaurant jobs to finance his education, Tang graduated from California State Polytechnic University, Pomona, in 1986 with a chemical engineering degree.

Finance career
His career in finance began at Merrill Lynch & Co. in 1987 on the institutional equity sales team, later moving to Lehman Brothers and concentrating on fixed income institutional sales. He joined Bear, Stearns & Co. Inc. in 1992 in Los Angeles as senior managing director of investment banking. In 1993, he was appointed president and chief executive officer of Bear Stearns Asia and moved to its Hong Kong office, subsequently being named chairman of Bear Stearns Asia. From 1993 to 1999, he built up its Asian operations, opening offices in China and Singapore. Tang's Asian expansion focused on five product areas including equities, fixed income, investment banking, wealth management and derivatives. While in Hong Kong, Tang was elected to the board of directors of Bear Stearns & Co. in 1997.

In March 1999, Tang moved to Chicago and managed the Bear Stearns Midwest Region. In 2001, his accomplishments in the Midwest were recognized by the Bear Stearns board of directors, which elected him to vice chairman of the company. He was then transferred to Los Angeles, with a dual mandate to both manage its West Coast operations and, as chairman and CEO of Bear Stearns Asia, to supervise all activity in Asia. In 2003, Tang was appointed chairman and president of Bear Stearns International Holdings.

Tang was instrumental in advising an arm of the CITIC Group during its unprecedented $1.15 billion acquisition of Nations Energy in Kazakhstan. He led the Bear Stearns team representing Hunan Valin Group, a Chinese steel company, when it sold a 37 percent stake to Mittal Steel (now ArcelorMittal) in what was then the largest acquisition by an international strategic investor of a Chinese-listed firm. Following that deal, Lakshmi Mittal was quoted in the Financial Times saying, "Anyone seeking to do a major deal in China will learn about Donald Tang."

Jimmy Cayne, the CEO of Bear Stearns, kept an Ek Chor brand motorcycle in his office to commemorate Tang's work in arranging the groundbreaking New York Stock Exchange listing of the Ek Chor China Motorcycle Co., a joint venture between Thai and Chinese interests.

Under Tang's leadership, Bear Stearns Asia was the financial advisor to the telecommunications giant China Mobile and jointly led its secondary offering. Bear Stearns was the financial advisor and co-lead manager for the IPO of China Telecom. Bear Stearns Asia under Tang was also the financial advisor for Guangshen Railway Co Ltd., Beijing Yanhua Petrochemical Ltd. and Yanzhou Coal Mining Co Ltd. arranging pioneering financial transactions in their respective industries.

Entertainment media
Before the formation of Tang Media Partners, Tang was instrumental in facilitating the deal that resulted in Dalian Wanda, a leading Chinese conglomerate, acquiring AMC Entertainment Holdings for $2.6B in 2012.

In June 2016, Tang Media Partners acquired majority ownership of IM Global which featured a robust international film, television, music production, sales and distribution platform. At the time of the acquisition, TMP announced a partnership involving IM Global and China's social media giant Tencent to form a new television production joint venture under IM Global called IM Global TV.

Tang continued expanding the global reach of TMP with the purchase of the US motion picture distributor Open Road Films from AMC and Regal. Open Road has released more than 35 feature films with combined global box office of over $1 billion including the best picture Oscar-winning Spotlight. Open Road is the youngest studio to receive the Oscar for Best Picture.

In 2017, Tang Media Partners created Global Road Entertainment as an operating unit incorporating Open Road, IM Global and IM Global TV, focused on tailoring content for both worldwide audiences as well as regional tastes. Tang recruited Rob Friedman, the former co-chairman of Lionsgate's Motion Picture Group, former vice chair of Paramount Pictures and a former longtime executive at Warner Brothers to be chairman and CEO of Global Road. Friedman has helped guide some of Hollywood's biggest franchises, including The Hunger Games and Twilight films. He is also behind such box office and critically acclaimed hits such as La La Land, Hacksaw Ridge and The Hurt Locker.

Today, Tang continues to pursue his interest in finance and real estate through select private ventures. In November 2022, he joined fast-fashion brand Shein as executive vice chairman. According to Forbes, the move was to help Shein become more attractive to investors after controversies over its exploitation of cheap labor and environmental impacts.

Directorships, civic organizations and media
Current and past board memberships include:
 Director of Tribune Publishing Company (NYSE: TPUB)
 Trustee of the RAND Corporation and member of the Rand Advisory Board for the Center for Asia Pacific Policy, and chairman of the Rand Banking Reform Committee on China;
 Trustee of California Institute of Technology
 Advisory Committee for Harvard University Asia Center
 Trustee emeritus of Asia Society Southern California
 Board of trustees member, Museum of Contemporary Art, Los Angeles
 Member of the Committee of 100
 Member of board of councilors of the USC Annenberg School for Communication
 Member of board of UCLA Medical Center
 Member of the board of councilors of the China US Center for Sustainable Development and chair the China-US People to People Partnership Initiative
 Member of the Chicago Mayor's Council of Technology Advisors

Honors include:
 2000-2001 "40 under 40" designation from Crain's Chicago Business magazine
 2002-2003 "Spirit of Los Angeles" Award from United Way 
 2004 Chairman's Award of the Asia Society 
 2004 Alexis de Tocqueville Society Award presented to Tang and his wife, Jean, for their commitment to human service
 2007 Los Angeles Urban League Community Coalition Award 
 2007 Sponsors for Educational Opportunity Corporate Leadership Award

Tang hosted the C100 panel on Hollywood and China in Beverly Hills on April 16, 2016. He was a featured speaker at the Variety magazine-sponsored 2015 US-China Film and TV Expo in Los Angeles. Tang was keynote speaker at the 2010 University of Pennsylvania Wharton School Asia Conference, He has been profiled in publications such as The Wall Street Journal, Financial Times, and Los Angeles Times. On television, he is a contributor to CNBC's Closing Bell, discussing all things China-related.

References

Year of birth missing (living people)
Living people
American chief executives of financial services companies
American financial businesspeople
American investment bankers
Bear Stearns
Businesspeople from California
Businesspeople from Shanghai
California State Polytechnic University, Pomona alumni
Chinese emigrants to the United States
Lehman Brothers people
Merrill (company) people
Members of Committee of 100